O~3 Entertainment was an American video game developer for the GameCube, Nintendo DS, PlayStation 3, Xbox, Xbox 360, and Microsoft Windows. The company ceased operations in 2008.

Games
 World Championship Tennis (2004) Windows
 Alien Hominid (2004) GameCube, PlayStation 2
 D-Day (2004) Windows
 Medieval Lords: Build, Defend, Expand (2004) Windows
 Torrente (2004) Windows
 Chaos Field (2005) GameCube
 Pocket Dogs (2005) Game Boy Advance
 Konductra (2006) Nintendo DS
 Tank Beat (2007) Nintendo DS
 Chaos Wars (2008) PlayStation 2

Cancelled
 Dark Light (2007) Game Boy Advance
 Pocket Pets (2007) Nintendo DS (released by Empire Interactive as Animal Paradise)
 Radio Allergy (2007) GameCube
 Eye Q Nintendo DS

Defunct video game companies of the United States
Video game publishers